The 2005–06 season was Tottenham Hotspur's 14th season in the Premier League and 28th successive season in the top division of the English football league system.

Season summary
During the 2005–06 English football season, Tottenham Hotspur participated in the English Premier League. The club had a mixed, short season, securing what was their highest place finish in the Premier league at the time, but exiting both cup competitions at the earliest possible stage against lower league opposition, therefore playing just 40 games.

In September Tottenham faced Grimsby Town in the League Cup, losing 1–0 at Blundell Park. Their FA cup draw pitted the team against Leicester City, but the side let a two-goal lead slip, and an injury time goal saw them defeated 3–2 at Walkers Stadium.

In the league Tottenham had occupied the crucial fourth place in the table for much of the latter half of the season. Their win in their penultimate game of the season against Bolton Wanderers on 30 April meant they were seven points ahead of their nearest rivals Arsenal in the race for possible Champions League qualification. Despite Arsenal winning their two games in hand, Tottenham only had to match their result in the final game of the season in order to secure fourth spot.

On the morning of the decisive match against West Ham United a number of Tottenham players were taken ill with suspected food poisoning, the players having stayed the night at the Marriott Hotel in Canary Wharf and eaten lasagne. The club appealed for the Premier League to delay the kick off, but the police would not allow a kick off any later than 5pm, due to crowd control concerns, so the club decided to play at the scheduled time. Despite the scoreline being 1–1 for much of the game, Tottenham looked set to clinch fourth spot due to Arsenal trailing 2–1 at Highbury against Wigan Athletic. But Arsenal went on to win their fixture 4–2, with a Thierry Henry hat-trick, meaning Tottenham also required a win. Their fate was sealed when Yossi Benayoun scored a winner for West Ham, meaning Tottenham fell to fifth place and therefore would only play in the following season's UEFA Cup.

Tottenham appealed to the Premier League to have the match against West Ham replayed, but this was rejected as no grounds were found for accepting the request. Club chairman Daniel Levy called in the police to investigate the Marriott Hotel and threatened to sue the hotel chain and Premier League over the incident, having wrongly suspected foul play. Tests by the Health Protection Agency on the food at the hotel soon proved to be negative for sources of food poisoning and instead players were identified as having norovirus.

First-team squad

Left club during season

Reserve squad

Transfers

In
  Tom Huddlestone –  Derby County, undisclosed (est. £2,500,000)
  Paul Stalteri –  Werder Bremen, 16 May, undisclosed
  Aaron Lennon –  Leeds United, 15 June, £1,000,000
  Teemu Tainio –  Auxerre, 1 July, free
  Wayne Routledge –  Crystal Palace, 1 July, £1,250,000 (rising to £2,000,000)
  Edgar Davids –  Inter Milan, 3 August, free
  Lee Young-Pyo –  PSV, £1,350,000, 31 August
  Jermaine Jenas –  Newcastle United, 31 August, £7,000,000
  Grzegorz Rasiak –  Derby County, 31 August, undisclosed
  Hossam Ghaly –  Feyenoord, 31 January, undisclosed
  Danny Murphy –  Charlton Athletic, 31 January, £2,000,000

Out
  Frédéric Kanouté -  Sevilla, 18 August, £5,075,000
  Erik Edman -  Rennes, 3 August, undisclosed
  Sean Davis,  Noé Pamarot,  Pedro Mendes –  Portsmouth, 12 January, £7,500,000 combined
  Michael Brown –  Fulham, 31 January, undisclosed
  Emil Hallfreðsson -  Malmö, loan
  Rodrigo Defendi -  Udinese, loan

Transfers in:  £15,100,000
Transfers out:  £12,575,000
Total spending:  £2,525,000

Loans out
  Philip Ifil -  Millwall, 13 September, three-month loan
  Mounir El Hamdaoui -  Derby County, 16 September, three-month loan
  Johnnie Jackson -  Derby County, 16 September, three-month loan
  Márton Fülöp -  Coventry City, 28 October, three-month loan
  Philip Ifil -  Millwall, 20 January, season-long loan
  Reto Ziegler –  Wigan Athletic, 23 January, season-long loan
  Wayne Routledge –  Portsmouth, 30 January, season-long loan

Competitions Overview

Results

Premier League

FA Cup

League Cup

Final league table

Statistics

Appearances and goals

|-
! colspan=14 style=background:#dcdcdc; text-align:center| Goalkeepers

|-
! colspan=14 style=background:#dcdcdc; text-align:center| Defenders

|-
! colspan=14 style=background:#dcdcdc; text-align:center| Midfielders

|-
! colspan=14 style=background:#dcdcdc; text-align:center| Forwards

|-
! colspan=14 style=background:#dcdcdc; text-align:center| Players transferred out during the season

|}

Goal scorers 

The list is sorted by shirt number when total goals are equal.

Clean sheets

Notes

References

Tottenham Hotspur
Tottenham Hotspur F.C. seasons